Agaeocera is a genus of beetles in the family Buprestidae, containing the following species:

 Agaeocera gentilis (Horn, 1885)
 Agaeocera gigas (Gory & Laporte, 1839)
 Agaeocera scintillans Waterhouse, 1882

References

Buprestidae genera